Governor Generoso, officially the Municipality of Governor Generoso, is a 2nd class municipality in the province of Davao Oriental, Philippines. According to the 2020 census, it has a population of 59,891 people.

It is formerly known as Sigaboy.

The municipality is named after Sebastian T. Generoso, a former governor of Davao Province.

Miangas, Indonesia (also known as Isla de las Palmas) is located directly southeast of this municipality.

Before and after World War II, Francisco Durico Serrano (son of Saturnina Dagking,founder of Cambaleon, San Isidro) was the Mayor of the undivided Governor Generoso until the time when Philippines was given independence. He took down the American flag and raised our Philippine flag with so much honor.

Geography

Climate

Barangays
Generoso is politically subdivided into 20 barangays.

Demographics

Economy

References

External links
 Governor Generoso Profile at the DTI Cities and Municipalities Competitive Index
 [ Philippine Standard Geographic Code]
2000 Philippine Census Information
Local Governance Performance Management System 

Municipalities of Davao Oriental